Dehydroandrosterone (DHA), or 5-dehydroandrosterone (5-DHA), also known as isoandrostenolone, as well as androst-5-en-3α-ol-17-one, is an endogenous androgen steroid hormone. It is the 3α-epimer of dehydroepiandrosterone (DHEA; androst-5-en-3β-ol-17-one) and the 5(6)-dehydrogenated and non-5α-reduced analogue of androsterone (5α-androstan-3α-ol-17-one). DHA is produced in and secreted from the adrenal glands, along with other weak androgens like DHEA, androstenediol, and androstenedione.

See also
 3α-Androstanediol
 Epiandrosterone

References

Sterols
Androgens and anabolic steroids
Androstanes
Hormones of the hypothalamus-pituitary-gonad axis
Ketones
Sex hormones